Norman Bloomfield James (August 4, 1872 – December 12, 1963) was a farmer and provincial politician from Alberta, Canada. He served as a member of the Legislative Assembly of Alberta from 1935 to 1948 sitting with the Social Credit caucus in government.

Early life
Norman Bloomfield James was born on August 4, 1872 in Wandsworth, England. He attended post secondary education at Aberystwyth University. Bloomfield moved to Canada in 1893. He settled near Youngstown, Alberta and began farming.

Political career
James ran for a seat to the Alberta Legislature as a Social Credit candidate in the electoral district of Acadia in the 1935 Alberta general election. He defeated incumbent Lorne Proudfoot and another candidate with a landslide majority to pick up the seat for his party.

The 1939 boundary redistribution saw the electoral district of Acadia merged with Coronation to form Acadia-Coronation. James decided to run for re-election in the electoral district of Edmonton in the 1940 Alberta general election. James was returned winning the third place seat out of five.

James ran for a third term in office in the 1944 Alberta general election. He barely hung onto his seat winning in the final vote count.

James retired from provincial politics at dissolution of the assembly in 1948.

He published "The Autobiography of a Nobody" in 1948.

References

External links
Legislative Assembly of Alberta Members Listing

1872 births
1963 deaths
Alberta Social Credit Party MLAs
Alumni of Aberystwyth University